Damian McInally (born 23 December 1975 in Brisbane, Australia) is a Rugby Union player who has represented Australia in the annual under 21 southern cross championships and Australian Rugby Sevens.
A quick and elusive outside back he has played for the Queensland Reds and ACT Brumbies in the Southern Hemisphere Super 12 competition (now Super Rugby). Whilst contracted to the ACT Brumbies, McInally captained the Canberra Vikings team Queensland Premier Rugby championships three consecutive titles, 2001, 2002 and 2003, in the premier Queensland Premier Rugby competition.
McInally played for Japan's Top League side the Kubota Spears from 2004–09. He was refused permission to represent Japan in the 2007 Rugby World Cup competition in France. 

McInally made his debut for the ACT Veterans Rugby Club on 2 May 2015. Stephen Larkham brought McInally to the match. The pair played alongside each other in the fastest ACT Veterans backline ever.

External links 
 Kubota Spears Profile
 Top League Player Profile

1975 births
Australian rugby union players
Living people
Rugby union fullbacks
Expatriate rugby union players in Japan
Australian expatriate rugby union players
Queensland Reds players
ACT Brumbies players
Kubota Spears Funabashi Tokyo Bay players
Australian expatriate sportspeople in Japan
Rugby union players from Brisbane